Leonard Bloomfield (April 1, 1887 – April 18, 1949) was an American linguist who led the development of structural linguistics in the United States during the 1930s and the 1940s. He is considered to be the father of American distributionalism. His influential textbook Language, published in 1933, presented a comprehensive description of American structural linguistics. He made significant contributions to Indo-European historical linguistics, the description of Austronesian languages, and description of languages of the Algonquian family.

Bloomfield's approach to linguistics was characterized by its emphasis on the scientific basis of linguistics and emphasis on formal procedures for the analysis of linguistic data. The influence of Bloomfieldian structural linguistics declined in the late 1950s and 1960s as the theory of generative grammar developed by Noam Chomsky came to predominate.

Early life and education
Bloomfield was born in Chicago, Illinois, on April 1, 1887, to Jewish parents (Sigmund Bloomfield and Carola Buber Bloomfield). His father immigrated to the United States as a child in 1868; the original family name Blumenfeld was changed to Bloomfield after their arrival. In 1896 his family moved to Elkhart Lake, Wisconsin, where he attended elementary school, but returned to Chicago for secondary school. His uncle Maurice Bloomfield was a prominent linguist at Johns Hopkins University, and his aunt Fannie Bloomfield Zeisler was a well-known concert pianist.

Bloomfield attended Harvard College from 1903 to 1906, graduating with the A.B. degree.  He subsequently began graduate work at the University of Wisconsin, taking courses in German and Germanic philology, in addition to courses in other Indo-European languages. A meeting with Indo-Europeanist Eduard Prokosch, a faculty member at the University of Wisconsin, convinced Bloomfield to pursue a career in linguistics. In 1908 Bloomfield moved to the University of Chicago, where he took courses in German and Indo-European philology with Frances A. Wood and Carl Darling Buck. His doctoral dissertation in Germanic historical linguistics, A semasiologic differentiation in Germanic secondary ablaut, was supervised by Wood, and he graduated in 1909.

He undertook further studies at the University of Leipzig and the University of Göttingen in 1913 and 1914 with leading Indo-Europeanists August Leskien, Karl Brugmann, as well as Hermann Oldenberg, a specialist in Vedic Sanskrit. Bloomfield also studied at Göttingen with Sanskrit specialist Jacob Wackernagel, and considered both Wackernagel and the Sanskrit grammatical tradition of rigorous grammatical analysis associated with Pāṇini as important influences on both his historical and descriptive work. Further training in Europe was a condition for promotion at the University of Illinois from Instructor to the rank of assistant professor.

Career
Bloomfield was instructor in German at the University of Cincinnati, 1909–1910; Instructor in German at the University of Illinois at Urbana–Champaign, 1910–1913; Assistant Professor of Comparative Philology and German, also University of Illinois, 1913–1921; Professor of German and Linguistics at the Ohio State University, 1921–1927; Professor of Germanic Philology at the University of Chicago, 1927–1940; Sterling Professor of Linguistics at Yale University, 1940–1949. During the summer of 1925 Bloomfield worked as Assistant Ethnologist with the Geological Survey of Canada in the Canadian Department of Mines, undertaking linguistic field work on Plains Cree; this position was arranged by Edward Sapir, who was then Chief of the Division of Anthropology,  Victoria Museum, Geological Survey of Canada, Canadian Department of Mines. In May 1946, he suffered a debilitating stroke, which ended his career.

Bloomfield was one of the founding members of the Linguistic Society of America. In 1924, along with George M. Bolling (Ohio State University) and Edgar Sturtevant (Yale University) he formed a committee to organize the creation of the Society, and drafted the call for the Society's foundation. He contributed the lead article to the inaugural issue of the Society's journal Language, and was President of the Society in 1935. He taught in the Society's summer Linguistic Institute in 1938–1941, with the 1938–1940 Institutes being held in Ann Arbor, Michigan, and the 1941 Institute in Chapel Hill, North Carolina.

Indo-European linguistics
Bloomfield's earliest work was in historical Germanic studies, beginning with his dissertation, and continuing with a number of papers on Indo-European and Germanic phonology and morphology.  His post-doctoral studies in Germany further strengthened his expertise in the Neogrammarian tradition, which still dominated Indo-European historical studies. Bloomfield throughout his career, but particularly during his early career, emphasized the Neogrammarian principle of regular sound change as a foundational concept in historical linguistics.

Bloomfield's work in Indo-European beyond his dissertation was limited to an article on palatal consonants in Sanskrit and one article on the Sanskrit grammatical tradition associated with Pāṇini, in addition to a number of book reviews. Bloomfield made extensive use of Indo-European materials to explain historical and comparative principles in both of his textbooks, An introduction to language (1914), and his seminal Language (1933). In his textbooks he selected Indo-European examples that supported the key Neogrammarian hypothesis of the regularity of sound change, and emphasized a sequence of steps essential to success in comparative work: (a) appropriate data in the form of texts which must be studied intensively and analysed; (b) application of the comparative method; (c) reconstruction of proto-forms. He further emphasized the importance of dialect studies where appropriate, and noted the significance of sociological factors such as prestige, and the impact of meaning. In addition to regular linguistic change, Bloomfield also allowed for borrowing and analogy.

It is argued that Bloomfield's Indo-European work had two broad implications: "He stated clearly the theoretical bases for Indo-European linguistics" and "he established the study of Indo-European languages firmly within general linguistics."

Sanskrit studies
As part of his training with leading Indo-Europeanists in Germany in 1913 and 1914 Bloomfield studied the Sanskrit grammatical tradition originating with Pāṇini, who lived in northwestern India during the fifth or fourth century BC. Pāṇini's grammar is characterized by its extreme thoroughness and explicitness in accounting for Sanskrit linguistic forms, and by its complex context-sensitive, rule-based generative structure. Bloomfield noted that "Pāṇini gives the formation of every inflected, compounded, or derived word, with an exact statement of the sound-variations (including accent) and of the meaning". In a letter to Algonquianist Truman Michelson, Bloomfield noted "My models are Pāṇini and the kind of work done in Indo-European by my teacher, Professor Wackernagel of Basle."

Pāṇini's systematic approach to analysis includes components for: (a) forming grammatical rules, (b) an inventory of sounds, (c) a list of verbal roots organized into sublists, and (d) a list of classes of morphs. Bloomfield's approach to key linguistic ideas in his textbook Language reflect the influence of Pāṇini in his treatment of basic concepts such as linguistic form, free form, and others. Similarly, Pāṇini is the source for Bloomfield's use of the terms exocentric and endocentric used to describe compound words. Concepts from Pāṇini are found in Eastern Ojibwa, published posthumously in 1958, in particular his use of the concept of a morphological zero, a morpheme that has no overt realization. Pāṇini's influence is also present in Bloomfield's approach to determining parts of speech (Bloomfield uses the term "form-classes") in both Eastern Ojibwa and in the later Menomini language, published posthumously in 1962.

Austronesian linguistics
While at the University of Illinois Bloomfield undertook research on Tagalog, an Austronesian language spoken in the Philippines. He carried out linguistic field work with Alfredo Viola Santiago, who was an engineering student at the university from 1914 to 1917. The results were published as Tagalog texts with grammatical analysis, which includes a series of texts dictated by Santiago in addition to an extensive grammatical description and analysis of every word in the texts. Bloomfield's work on Tagalog, from the beginning of field research to publication, took no more than two years. His study of Tagalog has been described as "the best treatment of any Austronesian language ... The result is a description of Tagalog which has never been surpassed for completeness, accuracy, and wealth of exemplification."

Bloomfield's only other publication on an Austronesian language was an article on the syntax of Ilocano, based upon research undertaken with a native speaker of Ilocano who was a student at Yale University. This article has been described as a "tour de force, for it covers in less than seven pages the entire taxonomic syntax of Ilocano".

Algonquian linguistics
Bloomfield's work on Algonquian languages had both descriptive and comparative components. He published extensively on four Algonquian languages: Fox, Cree, Menominee, and Ojibwe, publishing grammars, lexicons, and text collections. Bloomfield used the materials collected in his descriptive work to undertake comparative studies leading to the reconstruction of Proto-Algonquian, with an early study reconstructing the sound system of Proto-Algonquian, and a subsequent more extensive paper refining his phonological analysis and adding extensive historical information on general features of Algonquian grammar.

Bloomfield undertook field research on Cree, Menominee, and Ojibwe, and analysed the material in previously published Fox text collections. His first Algonquian research, beginning around 1919, involved study of text collections in the Fox language that had been published by William Jones and Truman Michelson. Working through the texts in these collections, Bloomfield excerpted grammatical information to create a grammatical sketch of Fox. A lexicon of Fox based on his excerpted material was published posthumously.

Bloomfield undertook field research on Menominee in the summers of 1920 and 1921, with further brief field research in September 1939 and intermittent visits from Menominee speakers in Chicago in the late 1930s, in addition to correspondence with speakers during the same period.  Material collected by Morris Swadesh in 1937 and 1938, often in response to specific queries from Bloomfield, supplemented his information. Significant publications include a collection of texts, a grammar and a lexicon (both published posthumously), in addition to a theoretically significant article on Menomini phonological alternations.

Bloomfield undertook field research in 1925 among Plains Cree speakers in Saskatchewan at the Sweet Grass reserve, and also at the Star Blanket reserve, resulting in two volumes of texts and a posthumous lexicon. He also undertook brief field work on Swampy Cree at The Pas, Manitoba. Bloomfield's work on Swampy Cree provided data to support the predictive power of the hypothesis of exceptionless phonological change.

Bloomfield's initial research on Ojibwe was through study of texts collected by William Jones, in addition to nineteenth century grammars and dictionaries. During the 1938 Linguistic Society of America Linguistic Institute held at the University of Michigan in Ann Arbor, Michigan, he taught a field methods class with Andrew Medler, a speaker of the Ottawa dialect who was born in Saginaw, Michigan, but spent most of his life on Walpole Island, Ontario. The resulting grammatical description, transcribed sentences, texts, and lexicon were published posthumously in a single volume. In 1941 Bloomfield worked with Ottawa dialect speaker Angeline Williams at the 1941 Linguistic Institute held at the University of North Carolina in Chapel Hill, North Carolina, resulting in a posthumously published volume of texts.

Selected publications
Bloomfield, Leonard. 1909/1910. "A semasiological differentiation in Germanic secondary ablaut". Modern Philology 7:245–288; 345–382.

 Bloomfield, Leonard. 1914. Introduction to the Study of Language. New York: Henry Holt. Reprinted 1983, John Benjamins. Retrieved April 19, 2009. .
 
 
Bloomfield, Leonard. 1917. Tagalog texts with grammatical analysis. University of Illinois studies in language and literature, 3.2-4. Urbana, Illinois.

Bloomfield, Leonard. 1925–1927. "Notes on the Fox language." International Journal of American Linguistics 3:219-232; 4: 181-219
  (reprinted in: Martin Joos, ed., Readings in Linguistics I, Chicago and London: The University of Chicago Press 1957, 26–31).
 
 
Bloomfield, Leonard. 1928. Menomini texts. Publications of the American Ethnological Society 12. New York: G. E. Stechert, Agents. [reprinted 1974. New York: AMS Press] 
 
 Bloomfield, Leondard. 1929. Review of Bruno Liebich, 1928, Konkordanz Pāṇini-Candra, Breslau: M. & H. Marcus. Language 5:267–276. Reprinted in Hockett, Charles. 1970, pp. 219–226.
Bloomfield, Leonard. 1930. Sacred stories of the Sweet Grass Cree. National Museum of Canada Bulletin, 60 (Anthropological Series 11). Ottawa. [reprinted 1993, Saskatoon, SK: Fifth House]. 
Bloomfield, Leonard. 1933. Language. New York: Henry Holt. , 
Bloomfield, Leonard. 1934. Plains Cree texts. American Ethnological Society Publications 16. New York. [reprinted 1974, New York: AMS Press]
 Bloomfield, Leonard. 1935. "Linguistic aspects of science". Philosophy of Science 2/4:499–517.
Bloomfield, Leonard. 1939. "Menomini morphophonemics". Etudes phonologiques dédiées à la mémoire de M. le prince N.S. Trubetzkoy, 105–115. Travaux du Cercle Linguistique de Prague 8. Prague.
 Bloomfield, Leonard. 1939a. Linguistic aspects of science. Chicago: University of Chicago Press. 

 Bloomfield, Leonard. 1942a. Outline guide for the practical study of foreign languages. Baltimore: Linguistic Society of America.
Bloomfield, Leonard. 1946. "Algonquian." Harry Hoijer et al., eds., Linguistic structures of native America, pp. 85–129. Viking Fund Publications in Anthropology 6. New York: Wenner-Gren Foundation.
Bloomfield, Leonard. 1958. Eastern Ojibwa. Ed. Charles F. Hockett. Ann Arbor: University of Michigan Press.
Bloomfield, Leonard. 1962. The Menomini language. Ed. Charles F. Hockett. New Haven: Yale University Press.
Bloomfield, Leonard. 1975. Menomini lexicon. Ed. Charles F. Hockett. Milwaukee Public Museum Publications in Anthropology and History. Milwaukee: Milwaukee Public Museum.
Bloomfield, Leonard. 1984. Cree-English lexicon. Ed. Charles F. Hockett. New Haven: Human Relations Area Files. 
Bloomfield, Leonard. 1984b. Fox-English lexicon. Ed. Charles F. Hockett. New Haven: Human Relations Area Files.

Notes

References

Despres, Leon M. 1987. “My recollections of Leonard Bloomfield.” Robert A. Hall, Jr., ed., Leonard Bloomfield: Essays on his life and work, pp. 3–14. Philadelphia: John Benjamins. 
Fought, John G. 1999a. Leonard Bloomfield: Biographical Sketches. Taylor & Francis.
Fought, John G. 1999b. "Leonard Bloomfield's linguistic legacy: Later uses of some technical features". Historiographica linguistica 26/3: 313–332. 
Goddard, Ives. 1987. "Leonard Bloomfield's descriptive and comparative studies of Algonquian". Robert A. Hall, Jr., ed., Leonard Bloomfield: Essays on his life and work, pp. 179–217. Philadelphia: John Benjamins. 
Hall, Robert A. Jr. 1987. Leonard Bloomfield: Essays on his life and work. Amsterdam: Benjamins. 
Hall, Robert A. 1987. "Bloomfield and semantics". Robert A. Hall, Jr., ed., Leonard Bloomfield: Essays on his life and work, pp. 155–160. Philadelphia: John Benjamins. 
Hall, Robert A. Jr. 1990. A life for language: A biographical memoir of Leonard Bloomfield. Philadelphia: John Benjamins. 
Hockett, Charles F., ed., 1970. A Leonard Bloomfield Anthology. Bloomington: Indiana University Press. 
Harris, Randy Allen. 1995. The Linguistics Wars. New York: Oxford University Press.
Hockett, Charles F. 1987. “Letters from Bloomfield to Michelson and Sapir.” Robert A. Hall, Jr., ed., Leonard Bloomfield: Essays on his life and work, pp. 39–60. Philadelphia: John Benjamins. 
Hockett, Charles F. 1999. "Leonard Bloomfield: After fifty years." Historiographica linguistica 26/3: 295–311. 
Hoenigswald, Henry M. 1987. “Bloomfield and historical linguistics.” Robert A. Hall, Jr., ed., Leonard Bloomfield: Essays on his life and work,  pp. 73–88. Philadelphia: John Benjamins. 
Jones, William. 1907. "Fox texts". American Ethnological Society Publications 1. Leiden. [reprinted 1974, New York: AMS Press]
Jones, William. 1911. "Algonquian (Fox)". [edited posthumously by Truman Michelson] Franz Boas, ed., Handbook of American Indian languages, Part I, pp. 735–873. Bureau of American Ethnology Bulletin 40. Washington: Smithsonian Institution.
Jones, William. 1917. Ojibwa texts. Volume 1. Ed. Truman Michelson. Leiden: American Ethnological Society Publications 7.1 (Vol. 1).
Jones, William. 1919. Ojibwa texts. Volume 2. Ed. Truman Michelson. New York: G. Stechert.
Lehmann, Winfred P. 1987. "Bloomfield as an Indo-Europeanist". Robert A. Hall, Jr., ed., Leonard Bloomfield: Essays on his life and work, pp. 163–172. Philadelphia: John Benjamins. 
Manaster Ramer, Alexis. 1992–1993. "Ever since Bloomfield". in: Proceedings of the international congress of linguists 15/1: 308–310. 
Michelson, Truman. 1921. "The Owl sacred pack of the Fox Indians". Bureau of American Ethnology Bulletin 72. Washington: Smithsonian Institution.
Michelson, Truman. 1925. "Accompanying papers". Bureau of American Ethnology Annual Report 40: 21–658. Washington: Smithsonian Institution.
Nichols, John D. and Leonard Bloomfield, eds. 1991. The dog's children. Anishinaabe texts told by Angeline Williams. Winnipeg: Publications of the Algonquian Text Society, University of Manitoba. 
Robins, R. H. "Leonard Bloomfield: The man and the man of science". Transactions of the Philological Society 86: 63–87.
Rogers, David E. 1987. "The influence of Pāṇini on Leonard Bloomfield". Robert A. Hall, Jr., ed., Leonard Bloomfield: Essays on his life and work, pp. 89–138. Philadelphia: John Benjamins. 
Sayers, Frances Clarke. 1987. "The small mythologies of Leonard Bloomfield". Robert A. Hall, Jr., ed., Leonard Bloomfield: Essays on his life and work, pp. 16–21. Philadelphia: John Benjamins. 
Wolff, John U. 1987. "Bloomfield as an Austronesianist". Robert A. Hall, Jr., ed., Leonard Bloomfield: Essays on his life and work'', pp. 173–178. Philadelphia: John Benjamins.

External links
 A biography (archived version)
 A bibliographic list about Bloomfield's reputation as a teacher in Linguist List website.
 Leonard Bloomfield "Linguistics and Mathematics" (Marcus Tomalin) (archived version)
Finding Aid to the Papers of Leonard Bloomfield, National Anthropological Archives, Smithsonian Institution (archived version)
 Leonard Bloomfield Book Award, Linguistic Society of America
 Guide to the Leonard Bloomfield Papers 1935-1943 at the University of Chicago Special Collections Research Center 

1887 births
1949 deaths
Jewish American social scientists
Linguists from the United States
Harvard College alumni
Leipzig University alumni
University of Chicago alumni
University of Wisconsin–Madison alumni
University of Cincinnati faculty
Ohio State University faculty
Yale University faculty
Phonologists
Morphologists
University of Chicago faculty
Linguists of Algic languages
American Sanskrit scholars
Linguistic Society of America presidents
People from Elkhart Lake, Wisconsin
20th-century linguists
Yale Sterling Professors
Jewish linguists
People from Chicago